The 1975–76 season was the 96th season of competitive football by Rangers.

Overview
Rangers played a total of 55 competitive matches during the 1975–76 season. The club won a third domestic treble in its history and, what would become, the first of two in three seasons.

This was the first season of the new Scottish Premier Division and the previous season's league flag was hoisted much to the delight of the home support in front of the visitors who just happened to be Celtic. A tense match ensued and although the visitors took the lead, Derek Johnstone equalised and Quinton Young netted the winner. The side did not continue this good form and only won five, and lost five, of the next fourteen league matches. On 13 December the club embarked on a 26 match unbeaten run in the league and cup competitions.

Despite Celtic still having a one-point lead as late as February, Rangers eventually clinched the league at Tannadice, thanks to a Johnstone goal after just 22 seconds, during the third last league match of the season. The side had won 16 out of the final 21 matches. The final margin of the title win was six points.
 
On the domestic cup front, the League Cup was won in the October against Celtic in a lunchtime Old Firm final, which were a feature of that time in trying to curb crowd violence. An Alex McDonald flying header in the second half, being the difference between the sides. The 1976 Scottish Cup Final saw Rangers play Heart of Midlothian. The side got off to a great start when Johnstone netted on 42 seconds. It was all but over when Alex McDonald scored right on the stroke of half time and Derek Johnstone grabbed a brace late on.

Results
All results are written with Rangers' score first.

Scottish Premier Division

European Cup

Scottish Cup

League Cup

Appearances

League table

See also
 1975–76 in Scottish football
 1975–76 Scottish Cup
 1975–76 Scottish League Cup
 1975–76 European Cup

References 

Rangers F.C. seasons
Rangers
Scottish football championship-winning seasons